Rumley is an unincorporated community in Van Buren County, Arkansas, United States. It was founded in 1866 by Henry Rumley. Rumley originally consisted of a series of small homes, a general store and had a largely self-sustaining agrarian economy. As with many contemporary towns, Rumley was situated on a railroad. Trains would provide dry goods and mail to the local store.

Van Buren County history

Van Buren County was created on 11 November 1833 and was formed from Independence, Clark and Izard Counties. The rugged landscape is conducive to subsistence agriculture and the Little Red River runs through its boundaries. The seat of government is located at Clinton. The county contains a portion of Greers Ferry Lake, a tourist destination and is bordered by Searcy (north), Stone (northeast), Cleburne (east), Faulkner (southeast), Conway (southwest) and Pope (west) Counties. Parts of Van Buren County were used to form Cleburne County in 1883 and Stone County in 1873. Several other boundary changes occurred in the 19th century. 

Unincorporated communities in Van Buren County, Arkansas
Populated places established in 1866
Unincorporated communities in Arkansas
1866 establishments in Arkansas